The Internationaler Apano Cup is a tennis tournament held in Dortmund, Germany from 2006 until 2013. The tournament was part of the ITF Men's Circuit except for the 2011 edition which was part of the ATP Challenger Tour.

Past finals

Singles

Doubles

References

External links
Official website 

ATP Challenger Tour
Tennis tournaments in Germany
Clay court tennis tournaments